Stichill is a village and civil parish in the historic county of Roxburghshire, a division of the Scottish Borders.

Stichill is mentioned as a manor of Sir Thomas Randolph, later the Earl of Moray, when in 1308 it was considered forfeited to Edward I of England and granted to Adam Gordon.

Stichill is also mentioned in Kenneth Young's biography of Sir Alec Douglas Home.

1513 Flodden Field :

Sometimes they fought farther afield but always against the English. One Home was killed in a battle against Henry Percy (Hotspur) at Verneuil in France in 1424 under 'auld alliance' of Scots with Frenchmen.

Nearer at hand was Flodden Field, a few miles south across the Tweed from the Home domain near Coldstream. On that drizzling wet day in September 1513 it was doubtless true, as Walter Scott wrote, that

The Border slogan rent the sky !A Home ! A Gordon ! was the cry....but the third Lord Home's actions on the battlefield were open to misinterpretation.

After an early successful skirmish against Lord Howard, Lord Home and his men retired from the field laden with spoils, leaving their King and hundreds of Scots to be slain and the battle lost. Home was severely criticized for running out. But did he? ' It is equally probable'  his descendant Alec claimed at the annual Flodden commemoration 450 years later, ' that having fought the skirmish, Home interpreted his duty as advance guard to press on and secure for the Scottish army the ford at Coldstream which would guarantee its safety. '

Speech on the 8th August 1968. 'If the descendants of the slain had erected a war memorial in stone the names of honour would be our own, ' he said.

Indisputable, however, is the fact that three years later, the third Lord Home and his brother were hanged and their heads displayed on the Tolbooth in Edinburgh.  The feuding Scots wrought their vengeance in blood, their hatreds in destruction. In the time of Mary Queen of Scots, one of the Home castles that stood at Stichill, a few miles north west of the Hirsel, was 'destroyit ', and then rebuilt as a rampart against the English, thanks to a gift of 2,000 livres from King of France.

The sixth Lord Home, instead of fighting the English, embraced them. King James VI of Scotland was his friend and with him in 1603 he travelled to London and to the throne of England. Home became a Privy Councillor and in March 1604 -5 was created earl as well as Lord Dunglas and Baron of Jedburgh. En deuxieme  noces, he married a noble English girl, Marie Sutton, eldest daughter of 9 th Lord of Dudley,  so putting the Scottish Homes firmly into the English aristocracy. ( Sir Alec Douglas-Home by Kenneth Young page 8 ).

His grandson was not so lucky. He fought for the King in the Civil War and lost his estates to the Cromwellians. They were returned by Charles II in 1660 and the forth Earl of Home a member of his Privy Chamber, marrying Anne Sackville, daughter of one of the king's close friends, the Earl of Dorset.

Strangely enough, later earl, the sixth, violently opposed the Act of Union of England and Scotland,  and his son was suspected of Jacobitism. A contemporary described him as ' a tall slovenly man endowed with very good parts; is a firm countryman but never would acknowledge King William'.

The eighth Earl, however, was a thorough Hanoverian and a professional soldier. He fought against Bonnie Prince Charlie in the '45, and was rewarded by King George II with the Governorship of Gibraltar and the rank of Lieutenant-General. He was leas lucky in love. He married a widow, daughter and heiress of a rich Jamaican; but deserted her within a year because, according to one account ' she's a witch, a quean, an old cozening Quean'. ( The Merry Wives of Windsor, IV.  iii. 180)

Pringles
The village lies in the historic territory of the Pringles, a notorious Riding family of Border Reivers. The Pringles of Stichill are a cadet branch of the Pringles of that Ilk. Robert Pringle of Baitingbush purchased the lands of Stichill in 1628, and his grandson, another Robert Pringle, was created 1st Pringle Baronet of Stichill, in the Baronetcy of Nova Scotia, in 1683. The Current Baronet is Sir Norman Murray Archibald MacGregor Pringle of Stichill, 10th Baronet.

See also
Stichill Kirk
List of places in the Scottish Borders
List of places in East Lothian
List of places in Midlothian
List of places in Scotland

References
Notes
2. Sir Alec Douglas-Home, Kenneth Young p 8

Sources
Balfour Paul, Sir James, The Scots Peerage IX Vols''. Edinburgh 1907

External links

RCAHMS record for Stichill Parish
RCAHMS record: Stichill House, doocot
RCAHMS/Canmore record of Stichill Manse, Steading
SCRAN image: Stichill Manse, muck hole from byre to midden
SCRAN image: Steam engine, boiler house, chimney, at Baillieknowe, Stichill
Googlebook: Stichill during the Commonwealth
Geograph photo 1198333: Stichill Linn
Geograph photo 159277 Stichill village
Stichill and surroundings on Ordnance Survey map

Villages in the Scottish Borders
Parishes in Roxburghshire